This article provides details of international football games played by the Libya national team from 2020 to present.

Results

2020

2021

2022

2023

References

Football in Libya
Results
2020s in Libyan sport